Olivia Cole (born 1981) is a British poet.

Biography
Cole was born and raised in Kent, and read English at Christ Church, Oxford.

After being a winner of the 2003 Eric Gregory Award, Cole quickly made her mark as a poet. In 2006, she appeared on the BBC documentary, Betjeman & Me: Griff Rhys Jones.

Her first collection, Restricted View was published in 2009.

Cole also works as a journalist in London and has written for The Spectator, the Financial Times and the London Evening Standard.

References

External links
Facebook Poets: Ten Rising Stars of British Poetry Times Online, 11 April 2009 
Olivia Cole biography nthposition.com
One on One: Olivia Cole considers Louis MacNeice's Snow Poetry Magazine
Olivia Cole The Daily Beast

1981 births
Living people
English women poets
21st-century British poets
21st-century English women writers